Keesler Air Force Base  is a United States Air Force base located in Biloxi, a city along the Gulf Coast in Harrison County, Mississippi, United States. The base is named in honor of aviator 2d Lt Samuel Reeves Keesler Jr., a Mississippi native killed in France during the First World War. The base is home of Headquarters, Second Air Force (2 AF) and the 81st Training Wing (81 TW) of the Air Education and Training Command (AETC).

The base has specialized in ground trade training since its opening in 1941 during World War II. It has had high-quality technical schools and absorbed units moved from other bases under the Base Realignment and Closure Act (BRAC).

History
In early January 1941, Biloxi city officials assembled a formal offer to invite the United States Army to build a base to support the World War II training buildup. The War Department activated Army Air Corps Station No. 8, Aviation Mechanics School, Biloxi, Mississippi, on 12 June 1941.  On August 25, 1941, the base was dedicated as Keesler Army Airfield, in honor of 2d Lt Samuel Reeves Keesler Jr., a Mississippi native and distinguished aerial observer, killed in action in France during the First World War.

Congress initially appropriated $6 million for construction at Biloxi and an additional $2 million for equipment. By the time the War Department allocated the funds in April 1941, the projected cost had risen to $9.6 million. On 14 June 1941, the U.S. Army Corps of Engineers awarded contracts totaling $10 million to build Biloxi's technical training school. At the time, it was the most expensive government project to have been undertaken in the State of Mississippi.

When the War Department activated Keesler Field in June 1941, not only was Keesler getting a technical training center, but it would be getting one of the Army's newest replacement, or basic training centers. The first shipment of recruits arrived at Keesler Field on 21 August 1941. Many stayed at Keesler to become airplane and engine mechanics, while others transferred to aerial gunnery or aviation cadet schools. Development of the base stimulated businesses and residential construction in Biloxi.

The Tuskegee Airmen were trained at Keesler. More than 7,000 Black soldiers were stationed at Keesler Field by the autumn of 1943. These soldiers included pre-aviation cadets, radio operators, aviation technicians, bombardiers, and aviation mechanics.

Keesler continued to focus upon specialized training in Consolidated B-24 Liberator maintenance until mid-1944. Thereafter, the base expanded its curricula to train mechanics for other aircraft. By September 1944, the number of recruits had dropped, but the workload remained constant. Keesler personnel began processing veteran ground troops and combat crews who had returned from duty overseas for additional training and follow-on assignments. The number of men who went through basic training wound down markedly after the end of World War II, and it was discontinued at Keesler on 30 June 1946.

Cold War
In late May 1947, the Radar School was established at Keesler (transferred from Boca Raton Army Air Field), making it responsible for operating the two largest military technical schools in the United States. Thereafter, shrinking budgets forced the base to reduce its operating costs: the Airplane and Engine Mechanics School and the Radar School were consolidated on 1 April 1948.

In early 1949, the Radio Operations School transferred to Keesler from Scott Air Force Base, Illinois. In addition to training radio operators, Keesler was to begin teaching air traffic service technicians; aircraft approach controllers, ground radar mechanics, and radar repairman/ground controlled approach specialists. The last mechanics training courses had moved to Sheppard Air Force Base, Texas, by November.

In early 1956, Keesler entered the missile age by opening a ground support training program for the Atlas missile. In 1958, all control tower operator, radio maintenance, and general radio operator courses were put  under Keesler's already broad technical training roof.

During the early 1960s, Keesler lost many of its airborne training courses, but it remained the largest training base throughout the 1970s.  This included limited flight training operations in the T-28 Trojan for Republic of Vietnam Air Force (VNAF) student pilots.

Hurricane Camille produced considerable damage as it passed over Biloxi in 1969.  Most of the Back Bay housing area was under water.

Keesler's student load dropped to an all-time low after the Vietnam War ended. As a result, Air Training Command inactivated the USAF School of Applied Aerospace Sciences on 1 April 1977 and replaced it with the 3300th Technical Training Wing, which activated the same day.

During the early 1980s Keesler's air traffic control program garnered publicity when the Professional Air Traffic Controllers Organization walked off the job in August 1981. When President Ronald Reagan fired the strikers, Keesler-trained military air traffic controllers were used to direct some of the nation's air traffic. As the air traffic control school it was also the logical location for the USAF Combat Controllers.

Keesler AFB was the primary training base for many avionics maintenance career fields, including Electronic Warfare, Navigational Aids, Computer Repair and Ground Radio Repair. It was also the primary training base for most USAF administrative career fields.

From the 1990s
Driven by defense budget cuts, base closures following the end of the Cold War forced an end to technical training at Chanute Air Force Base, Illinois, and Lowry Air Force Base, Colorado, when those bases were closed by Base Realignment and Closure Commission (BRAC) actions. Keesler acquired Chanute's weather forecasting courses and Lowry's meteorology and precision measurement equipment laboratory training programs during 1992 and 1993.

Massive restructuring of the Air Force in the early 1990s also meant several changes for Keesler associate units. The first occurred when the 53d Weather Reconnaissance Squadron was inactivated in the active duty Air Force, transferred to the Air Force Reserve and reactivated on 30 June 1991.

On 1 July 1993, the Air Training Command (ATC) was redesignated the Air Education and Training Command (AETC) and the command reactivated Second Air Force (2nd AF), stationing it at Keesler. Second Air Force's mission is to oversee all technical training conducted within AETC. The same day, Keesler Training Center was inactivated, and the 81st Training Wing arrived at the base. The 45th Airlift Squadron (45 AS), part of the 314th Airlift Wing at Little Rock AFB, Arkansas, was also located at Keesler.  The 45th AS provided flight crew training in the C-21 Learjet until 2007, when it moved to Scott AFB. 

Although non-essential personnel and Hurricane Hunter planes had been evacuated in advance, "drastic damage" was sustained by the base's industrial and housing areas. Due to storm surge about 50% of the base came under water; the commissary, base exchange, and some base housing units were flooded with more than six feet of water. By August 31, however, relief flights were landing at the base. On September 1 the first set of Airmen were evacuated to Sheppard AFB, TX. Other Airmen reached Sheppard AFB the next day, where they were welcomed and given basic items.

Units today
From 1993, the 81 TRW has provided technical training of airmen in select skill areas immediately following their completion of basic training, as well as providing additional or recurrent training.  On average, Keesler has 3,100 students on base at a time.  Much of the training they receive is in the field of electronics, such as wideband maintenance, ground radio, information technology, avionics, cryptography. The wing also trains meteorology personnel, radar operations, air traffic control, Aviation Resource Management (ARMS), and tropical cyclone forecasting.  Keesler AFB is one of the largest technical training wings in AETC, with four training squadrons located in the training building complex known as "the triangle," the 334th, 335th, 336th, and the 338th. The 81st Medical Group is also located at the base and operates the second largest medical center in the Air Force.

The Air Force Reserve Command's 403d Wing is also on base, and is an Air Mobility Command (AMC)-gained composite unit. It has an airlift squadron (the 815th Airlift Squadron), and the 53rd Weather Reconnaissance Squadron, a WC-130 unit known as the "Hurricane Hunters."

Finally, Keesler is also home to CNATTU Keesler (Center for Naval Aviation Technical Training Unit), a training unit for U.S. Navy and U.S. Marine Corps enlisted personnel receiving training at Keesler, such as enlisted meteorology training, with their Air Force counterparts.

Names, commands to which assigned, and units

Previous names
 Biloxi Air Corps Technical School, 13 June 1941
 Keesler Army Airfield, 25 August 1941
 Keesler Air Force Base, 13 January 1948 – Present

Major commands to which assigned
 Air Corps Technical Training Command, 7 Feb 1941
 Re-designated: Army Air Forces Technical Training Command, 1 March 1942
 Army Air Forces Flying Training Command, 7 July 1943
 Re-designated: Army Air Forces Training Command, 31 July 1943
 Air Training Command, 1 July 1946
 Air Education and Training Command, 1 July 1993 – Present

Major units assigned

 HQ and HQ Sq, 69th Air Base Group, 12 June 1941
 59th Air Base Squadron, 4 August 1941
 Re-designated: 59th Base HQ and Air Base Squadron, 22 June 1942
 51st Training Group, 5 August 1941 – 30 April 1944
 52d Training Group, 6 August 1941 – 30 April 1944
 55th Training Group, 29 August 1941 – 30 April 1944
 56th Training Group, 21 July 1941 – 30 April 1944
 57th Training Group, 5 March 1942 – 30 April 1944
 58th Training Group, 22 February 1943 – 30 April 1944
 59th Training Group, 22 February 1943 – 30 April 1944
 60th Training Group, 22 February 1943 – 30 April 1944 
 Army Air Fores Basic Training Center #2, 14 August 1941 – 1 August 1947
 Air Corps (later Air Forces, later USAF) Technical School, 14 August 1941 – 15 August 1973
 Air Corps (later Air Forces) Mechanics School #2, 5 August 1941 – 30 April 1944
 Air Corps (later Air Forces) Mechanics School #7, 13 April – 3 June 1942
 602d Training Group, 13 April 1942 – 30 April 1944

 603d Training Group, 5 March 1942 – 30 April 1944
 607th Training Group, 15 April 1942 – 30 April 1944
 611th Training Group, 23 July 1943 – 29 February 1944
 1169th Training Group, 18 December 1942 – 30 April 1944
 1170th Training Group, 18 December 1942 – 30 April 1944
 21st Training Wing, 22 February 1943 – 29 February 1944
 61st Training Wing, 23 July 1943 – 30 April 1944
 3704th AAF (later AF) Base Unit, 1 May 1944 – 22 August 1948
 3380th Technical Training Wing, 26 August 1948
 Later: Keesler Technical Training Center, 30 April 1976 – 30 June 1993
 8605th (later 8625th) Technical Training Wing, 26 June 1949 – 28 May 1951
 Air Force Processing Center, Keesler, 27 September 1950 – 16 February 1978
 11th Weather Squadron, 20 April 1952 – 18 November 1957
 USAF Air-Ground Operations School, 25 January 1957 – 1 November 1973
 53d Weather Reconnaissance Squadron, 1 July 1973 – 30 Jun 1991, 1 Nov 1993–present
 403d Wing (Air Force Reserve Command), 1 Nov 1983–Present
 81st Training Wing, 1 July 1993 – Present

Based units 
Flying and notable non-flying units based at Keesler Air Force Base.

Units marked GSU are Geographically Separate Units, which although based at Keesler, are subordinate to a parent unit based at another location.

United States Air Force 

Air Education and Training Command (AETC)
 Second Air Force
 Headquarters Second Air Force
 81st Training Wing (Host wing)
 Headquarters 81st Training Wing
 81st Training Group
 81st Training Support Squadron
 333rd Training Squadron
 334th Training Squadron
 335th Training Squadron
 336th Training Squadron
 338th Training Squadron
 81st Medical Group
 81st Mission Support Group
 81st Communications Squadron
 81st Contracting Squadron
 81st Force Support Squadron
 81st Logistics Readiness Squadron
 81st Security Forces Squadron
 81st Infrastructure Support Division

Air Combat Command (ACC)
 Sixteenth Air Force
 688th Cyberspace Wing
 38th Cyberspace Engineering Installation Group
 85th Engineering Installation Squadron (GSU)

Air Force Reserve Command (AFRC)
 Twenty-Second Air Force
 403rd Wing
 Headquarters 403rd Wing
 403rd Aeromedical Staging Squadron
 403rd Operations Group
 36th Aeromedical Evacuation Squadron
 53rd Weather Reconnaissance Squadron – WC-130J Super Hercules
 403rd Operations Support Flight
 815th Airlift Squadron – C-130J Super Hercules
 403rd Maintenance Group
 403rd Maintenance Squadron
 403rd Aircraft Maintenance Squadron
 Detachment 1
 403rd Mission Support Group
 41st Aerial Port Squadron
 403rd Communications Flight
 403rd Force Support Squadron
 403rd Logistics Readiness Squadron
 403rd Security Forces Squadron

US Marine Corps 
 Keesler Marine Detachment

See also

 Mississippi World War II Army Airfields
 Eastern (later Western) Technical Training Command

References

 Official history of Keesler AFB
 Manning, Thomas A. (2005), History of Air Education and Training Command, 1942–2002.  Office of History and Research, Headquarters, AETC, Randolph AFB, Texas

External links

 Official website
 Discoverkeesler.com (81st Force Support Squadron)

1943 establishments in Mississippi
Buildings and structures in Biloxi, Mississippi
Installations of the United States Air Force in Mississippi
Initial United States Air Force installations
USAF Air Training Command Installations